Cheiromoniliophora is a genus of fungi in the order Pleosporales in the class Dothideomycetes.

It is a genus incertae sedis, a genus of uncertain taxonomy that has not been placed in any family.

References

External links 

 
 Cheiromoniliophora at Mycobank.org

Pleosporales
Dothideomycetes genera
Taxa described in 1990